The Taub–NUT metric is an exact solution to Einstein's equations. It may be considered a first attempt in finding the metric of a spinning black hole. It is sometimes also used in homogeneous but anisotropic cosmological models formulated in the framework of general relativity.

Taub's solution is an empty space solution of Einstein's equations with topology R×S3 and metric (or equivalently line element)

where 

and m and l are positive constants.

When Roy Kerr developed the Kerr metric for spinning black holes in 1963, he ended up with a four-parameter solution, one of which was the mass and another the angular momentum of the central body. One of the two other parameters was the NUT-parameter, which he threw out of his solution because he found it to be nonphysical since it caused the metric to be not asymptotically flat, while other sources interpret it either as a gravomagnetic monopole parameter of the central mass, or a twisting property of the surrounding spacetime.

A simplified 1+1-dimensional version of the Taub–NUT spacetime is the Misner spacetime.

References

Notes

Exact solutions in general relativity